The Sandeśarāsaka, also known by its Apabhraṃśa name Saṃneharāsaya, (Apabhraṃśa: संनेहरासय) is an epic poem written around 1000–1100 by Addahamāṇa (thought be the Apabhraṃśa form of the name Abdur Rahman) in Apabhramsha. Its language is considered to be a version of Apabhramsha, the language that gave rise to modern Northwestern Indo-Aryan languages like  Punjabi and Sindhi.

The manuscripts of the book were discovered in Jain libraries by Muni Jinavijaya. According to Muni Jinavijaya, the work was written before the conquest by Ghori in 1192, when Multan was still a major Hindu pilgrimage center. The manuscripts include Sanskrit explanations by a Jain scholar in Sam. 1465.

Theme 
This epic poem is inspired by Meghaduta of Kalidasa.

The author invoked God using an expression that combines Hindu and Muslim perspectives:

माणुस्सदुव्वविज्जाहरेहिं णहमग्गि सूर ससि बिंबे।
आएहिं जो णमिज्जइ तं णयरे णमह कत्तारं।

māṇussaduvvavijjāharehiṃ ṇahamaggi sūra sasi biṃbe.
āehiṃ jo ṇamijjai taṃ ṇayare ṇamaha kattāraṃ.

O citizens, salute the creator who is saluted by men, gods, vidyadharas, the sun and the moon.

Cultural influence 
It is the only work by a Muslim in Apabhramsha, and it is a precursor of Baba Farid and books like Padmavat of Jayasi.

It is the first book that refers to a vernacular work based on Ramayana.

Two of the verses were quoted by Acharya Hemachandra (1088-1173).

See also
 Padmavat

References 

Indian poems
11th-century poems